Bay Area Breeze was a professional American women's soccer team. Founded in 2011, the team was based in Hayward, California. The team played in the Western Conference of the W-League. The team's colors were blue, white and green.

History
The Bay Area Breeze originally played in the Women's Premier Soccer League. They won the North Division of the Pacific Conference in 2011 with an 8–1–1 record. The team joined the W-League on January 16, 2013. Former Australian U17 Women's National Team Coach Vicki Linton was hired as head coach on April 4. They secured Kezar Stadium for their home games on May 3. The Breeze defeated Santa Clarita Blue Heat 1–0 in their W-League debut on May 25.

Year-by-Year

Links
 Team Facebook Page

References

Women's soccer clubs in California
USL W-League (1995–2015) teams
Soccer clubs in the San Francisco Bay Area
Soccer clubs in California